The Flowering is a live album by jazz saxophonist Charles Lloyd performed in France and Norway by the Charles Lloyd Quartet featuring Keith Jarrett, Cecil McBee and Jack DeJohnette.

Reception
The Allmusic review by Scott Yanow awarded the album 4½ stars and states "This set is even a bit better than the In Europe album due to the stronger (if more familiar) material".

Track listing
All compositions by Charles Lloyd except as indicated
 "Speak Low" (Ogden Nash, Kurt Weill) - 8:26  
 "Love-In/Island Blues" - 6:19  
 "Wilpan's" (Cecil McBee) - 6:39  
 "Gypsy '66" (Gábor Szabó) - 14:11  
 "Goin' to Memphis/Island Blues" - 7:04  
Recorded on July 23 & 24 at Juan-les-Pins Jazz Festival, Antibes, France and October 29, 1966 at Aulaen Hall, Oslo, Norway

Personnel
Charles Lloyd - tenor saxophone, flute
Keith Jarrett - piano
Cecil McBee - bass
Jack DeJohnette - drums

Production
Meny Bloch - engineer

References

Charles Lloyd (jazz musician) live albums
1971 live albums
Albums produced by George Avakian
Atlantic Records live albums
Albums recorded at Jazz à Juan